Band-e Saraji (also Romanized as Band-e Sarājī, Band-e Serājī, Band-e Serrājī, Band Sarajī, and Band Sarrājī; also known as Serājī) is a village in Halil Rural District, in the Central District of Jiroft County, Kerman Province, Iran. At the 2006 census, its population was 127, in 34 families.

References 

Populated places in Jiroft County